Portobello Power Station was a coal-fired power station in Portobello, Edinburgh which was built in 1923 by the Edinburgh Corporation in order to cope with the increasing demand for electricity in the city. Although originally intended to be built in 1913, its construction was delayed because of the First World War, and it was formally opened by George V ten years later. Its electricity was used to power Edinburgh and the surrounding region while waste heat warmed the water of Portobello Open Air Pool.
 
In 1938 the design of the station was extended by Edinburgh architect Ebenezer MacRae; its six individual chimneys were replaced with a single 365 feet tall stack, which weighed 10,000 tons, was made up of 710,000 bricks and cost in the region of £118,000 to build.

Between 1952 and 1955, the power station achieved the highest thermal efficiency of any station in the UK, with peak output of around 279 megawatts, although an explosion in February 1953 led to a two-hour power blackout across Edinburgh. The explosion, which could be heard a mile away, was caused by sea spray collecting on high-voltage insulators in the main-grid substation.

The power station closed on 31 March 1977 and demolished in 1980; a new housing estate was built on the site. During demolition, the chimney had to be taken down brick by brick because of its proximity to nearby houses.

The Portobello coat of arms on the power station was rescued during demolition and it was planned to incorporate it into a new sports centre to be built in the area. This never happened and in 2016 the broken coat of arms was located in a council storage facility in the west of Edinburgh.

References

1923 establishments in Scotland
1977 disestablishments in Scotland
Buildings and structures completed in 1923
Buildings and structures demolished in 1980
Former power stations in Scotland
Demolished buildings and structures in Scotland
Buildings and structures in Edinburgh
Economy of Edinburgh
History of Edinburgh
Portobello, Edinburgh